Docirava is a genus of moths in the family Geometridae.

Species
 Docirava aequilineata Walker, [1863]
 Docirava affinis Warren, 1894
 Docirava flavilinata Wileman, 1915
 Docirava vastata (Walker, 1866)

References
 Docirava at Markku Savela's Lepidoptera and Some Other Life Forms
 Natural History Museum Lepidoptera genus database

Chesiadini
Geometridae genera